Sir Frederick Crawford  (9 March 1906 – 27 May 1978) was a British colonial administrator.

Life
He was Governor of the Seychelles between 1951 and 1953. He was Deputy Governor of Kenya from 1953 to 1957 during the Mau Mau uprising. He was Governor of Uganda from 1957 to 1961. As governor of Uganda he believed it was too soon grant independence to Uganda, because he did not believe Uganda's economy could support itself as of the 1950s. However, he said he did favour the idea of independence, and that the British should begin laying the groundwork to make an independent Uganda economically sound. When Tanganyika was given independence Crawford felt this added pressure on himself to hurry up the timeline with regards to Uganda's independence. He believed that Uganda was far more prepared for independence than Tanganyika had been, with much more infrastructure, far more positions in the government already filled by Africans, and a more diversified economy. As Governor, Crawford called together a constitutional committee of African leaders from within Uganda to begin crafting a constitution that Uganda would ultimately have as an independent country "sometime within the next decade." When locally elected leaders of Uganda's government, specifically Milton Obote and the honourable A.G. Mehta, asked for more self-government, Crawford agreed and granted it.

He became a director of the Anglo-American Corporation and a resident of Rhodesia. His passport was withdrawn by the British government on 9 May 1968, while he was visiting London, because of his implicit support for Rhodesia's 1965 Unilateral Declaration of Independence, which Britain and the United Nations had deemed illegal.

References

1906 births
1978 deaths
British emigrants to Rhodesia
Governors of British Seychelles
Governors of Uganda
Knights Commander of the Order of St Michael and St George
Members of the Order of the British Empire
British people of the Mau Mau Uprising
British expatriates in Kenya